The 1987 Louisiana gubernatorial election was held to elect the Governor of Louisiana. Three-term incumbent Democratic Governor Edwin Edwards lost re-election to a fourth term, defeated by Democratic congressman Buddy Roemer.

Under Louisiana's jungle primary system, all candidates appear on the same ballot, regardless of party, and voters may vote for any candidate, regardless of their party affiliation. On October 24, 1987, Roemer and Edwards took the two highest popular vote counts. As neither took over 50% a runoff was scheduled, but Edwards withdrew, causing the runoff's cancellation.

Background 

In this election, the first round of voting was held on October 24. In second place, Edwin Edwards was entitled to face Roemer in the runoff, but he withdrew from the race after the first round of voting. Buddy Roemer, elected as a Democrat, switched his party affiliation to Republican during his term as governor.

Results 

First voting round, October 24

Runoff did not occur due to Edwards withdrawing

Sources 
State of Louisiana.  Primary and General Election Returns, 1987.

1987
Gubernatorial
Louisiana
October 1987 events in the United States